Talanga is a genus of moths of the family Crambidae described by Frederic Moore in 1885.

Species
Talanga advenalis (Snellen, 1895)
Talanga exquisitalis Kenrick, 1907
Talanga iridomelaena Munroe, 1968
Talanga lucretila (C. Swinhoe, 1901)
Talanga nubilosa Munroe, 1968
Talanga pallidimargo (de Joannis, 1929)
Talanga quadristigmalis Kenrick, 1907
Talanga sabacusalis (Walker, 1859)
Talanga sexpunctalis (Moore, 1877)
Talanga talangalis (Hampson, 1899)
Talanga tolumnialis (Walker, 1859)

References

Spilomelinae
Crambidae genera
Taxa named by Frederic Moore